The Hall of Central Harmony (Manchu:  dulimba-i hūwaliyambure deyen) is one of the three halls of the Outer Court of the Forbidden City, in Beijing, China, along with the Hall of Supreme Harmony and Hall of Preserving Harmony. It is smaller than the other two halls, and is square in shape. It was used by the Emperor to prepare and rest before and during ceremonies.

References

Forbidden City
Qing dynasty architecture